The 1996 Major League Soccer season was the inaugural season of Major League Soccer. It was also the 84th season of FIFA-sanctioned soccer in the United States, and the 18th with a national first-division league.

Overview

Preparation for first season
Major League Soccer had originally intended to begin competitive action in 1995. Various difficulties forced the league to postpone its first season until 1996. In preparation for its first season, the league began signing what it called marquee players, beginning with Tab Ramos on January 3, 1995.  Beginning in October 1995, the league apportioned the marquee players in the MLS Inaugural Allocations. Each team received two national team and two foreign players in the allocation. The league then invited about 250 players to a tryout the second week of January 1996 on the campus of UC Irvine.  On February 6 and 7, 1996, the league held its 1996 MLS Inaugural Player Draft in which the ten teams selected 160 players over sixteen rounds.  The Columbus Crew selected Brian McBride with the first pick of the draft. On March 4, 1996, the league then held the 1996 MLS College Draft followed by the 1996 MLS Supplemental Draft later that day. Despite the numerous drafts, the teams were not obligated to sign only players from the drafts.

Preseason
The preseason began the first week of March.  The teams reduced their rosters to twenty-two players by March 25 and had to make a final roster reduction to eighteen by April 15.  The teams had a $1,200,000 salary cap with no player allowed to receive more than $192,500.  In order to promote American players, teams were limited to five foreigners on the roster.

Season
Each of the 10 MLS teams played 32 games. A regulation win was worth three points, a shootout win one point, and zero points for a loss in any manner. Fear of alienating fans with tied games had led the league to adopting the shootout when games ended even. The league also adopted a countdown clock instead of running clock, unlike IFAB's standards. The league also divided the teams equally into two conferences – Eastern and Western.

The league began its first season on Saturday, April 6, 1996, when the San Jose Clash hosted D.C. United at Spartan Stadium. ESPN carried the game live which the Clash won on a goal by Eric Wynalda. That goal was selected as the Goal of the Year. The regular season ended on September 22. The playoffs began two days later.

Stadiums and locations

Personnel and sponsorships

Coaching changes

Standings

Eastern Conference

Western Conference

Overall standings

MLS Cup Playoffs

Bracket

 Best of Three series winners will advance.

Conference semifinals
Eastern Conference

 D.C. United wins series 2–1, advances to Conference finals.

 Tampa Bay Mutiny wins series 2–1, advances to Conference finals.

Western Conference

 Kansas City Wiz wins series 2–1, advances to Conference finals.

 Los Angeles Galaxy wins series 2–1, advances to Conference finals.

Conference finals
Eastern Conference

 D.C. United wins series 2–0, advances to MLS Cup '96.

Western Conference

 Los Angeles Galaxy wins series 2–0, advances to MLS Cup '96.

MLS Cup

 D.C. United and Los Angeles Galaxy earn a berth to the 1997 CONCACAF Champions' Cup.

Player awards

Weekly awards

Monthly awards

End-of-season awards

Player statistics

Top goal scorers

Goalkeeping leaders
(Minimum 1,000 minutes)

Attendance

References

External links
 1996 MLS Regular Season stats
 Soccer Hall of Fame

 
Major League Soccer seasons
1